The 1978 Colgate-Palmolive Grand Prix was a professional tennis circuit held that year. It consisted of four Grand Slam tournaments, the Grand Prix tournaments and the Nations Cup, a team event. In addition eight World Championship Tennis (WCT) tournaments, a separate professional tennis circuit held from 1971 through 1977, were incorporated into the Grand Prix circuit. The 28 tournaments with prize money of $175,000 or more formed the Super Series category. Jimmy Connors won 10 of the 84 tournaments which secured him the first place in the Grand Prix points ranking. However he did not play enough tournaments (13) to qualify for largest share ($300,000) of the bonus pool, which instead went to third–ranked Eddie Dibbs.

Schedule 
The table below shows the 1978 Colgate-Palmolive Grand Prix schedule (a forerunner to the ATP Tour).

January

February

March

April

May

June

July

August

September

October

November

December

January 1979

Points system 
The tournaments of the 1978 Grand Prix circuit were divided into nine point categories. The highest points were allocated to the Grand Slam tournaments; French Open, the Wimbledon Championships, the US Open and the Australian Open. The eight WCT events were part of the $175,000-plus "Super Grand Prix" category. Points were allocated based on these categories and the finishing position of a player in a tournament. The points table is based on a 32 player draw. No points were awarded to first-round losers and advancements by default were equal to winning a round. The points allocation, with doubles points listed in brackets, is as follows:

ATP rankings 

*The official ATP year-end rankings were listed from January 3rd, 1979.

List of tournament winners 
The list of winners and number of singles titles won, alphabetically by last name:
  Vijay Amritraj (1) Mexico City
  Arthur Ashe (3) San Jose, Columbus, Los Angeles
  Björn Borg (9) Birmingham WCT, Boca Raton, Las Vegas, Milan WCT, Rome, French Open, Wimbledon, Båstad, Tokyo Indoor
  José Luis Clerc (3) Florence, Buenos Aires, Santiago
  Jimmy Connors (10) Philadelphia, Denver, Memphis, Rotterdam WCT, Birmingham, Washington, D.C., Indianapolis, Stowe, US Open, Sydney Indoor
  Eddie Dibbs (4) Tulsa, Cincinnati, North Conway, Toronto
  Cliff Drysdale (1) Baltimore
  Mark Edmondson (1) Brisbane
  Peter Feigl (1) Cleveland
  Wojciech Fibak (1) Cologne
  Peter Fleming (1) Bologna
  Vitas Gerulaitis (3) Richmond WCT, Dallas WCT, Forest Hills WCT
  Brian Gottfried (3) Washington Indoor, Dayton, Houston
  Tim Gullikson (1) Johannesburg
  Heinz Günthardt (1) Springfield
  José Higueras (4) Cairo, Nice, Bournemouth, Madrid
  Kjell Johansson (1) Nigeria
  Chris Lewis (1) Kitzbühel
  Robert Lutz (1) Bercy
  Gene Mayer (1) Guadalajara
  Sandy Mayer (1) St. Louis WCT
  John McEnroe (4) Hartford, San Francisco, Stockholm, Wembley
  Bernard Mitton (1) Newport
  Ilie Năstase (2) Miami, WCT Challenge Cup
  Yannick Noah (2) Manila, Calcutta
  Manuel Orantes (1) Boston
  Adriano Panatta (1) Tokyo Outdoor
  Víctor Pecci (1) Bogotá
  Ulrich Pinner (1) Stuttgart Outdoor
  Raúl Ramírez (2) Mexico City WCT, Monte Carlo WCT
  Cliff Richey (1) Johannesburg
  Tony Roche (1) Queen's Club
  Bill Scanlon (1) Maui
  Tomáš Šmíd (1) Sarasota
  Stan Smith (2) Atlanta, Vienna
  Harold Solomon (2) Las Vegas, Louisville
  Dick Stockton (1) Little Rock
  Roscoe Tanner (2) Palm Springs, New Orleans
  Balázs Taróczy (2) Hilversum, Barcelona
  Brian Teacher (1) Taiwan
  Eliot Teltscher (1) Hong Kong
  Guillermo Vilas (7) Hamburg, Munich, Gstaad, South Orange, Aix-en-Provence, Basel, Australian Open
  Tim Wilkison (1) Sydney Outdoor
  Vladimír Zedník (1) Berlin
  Werner Zirngibl (1) Brussels

The following players won their first title in 1978:
  José Luis Clerc Florence
  Peter Feigl Cleveland
  Peter Fleming Bologna
  Heinz Günthardt Springfield
  Kjell Johansson Nigeria
  Gene Mayer Guadalajara
  John McEnroe Hartford
  Bernard Mitton Newport
  Yannick Noah Manila
  Ulrich Pinner Stuttgart Outdoor
  Tomáš Šmíd Sarasota
  Eliot Teltscher Hong Kong
  Tim Wilkison Sydney Outdoor

See also 
 1978 WTA Tour – women's circuit

References

External links 
 1978 ATP tournament archive
 ATP – History men's professional tours

Further reading 
 

 
Grand Prix tennis circuit seasons
Grand Prix